The Karol Szymanowski Academy of Music is a school of music of university level in Katowice, in Poland. It is named for Karol Szymanowski.

Studies 
The school offers full-time and part-time BA, MA and DA studies at two departments: Composition, Interpretation, Education and Jazz Department and Vocal-Instrumental Department. Studies are offered in the following fields:
 conducting (speciality: symphonic and opera conducting)
 composition and theory of music (specialties: composition, theory of music, eurhythmics)
 music education (specialties: music education, choral conducting, music therapy)
 jazz interpretation (specialties: composition and arrangements, instrumental performance, vocal performance) 
 instrumental performance
 vocal performance

It offers paid studies in given specialties in the English language. Study programs are based on the European Credit Transfer System.

Concerts 
Each year the school holds several artistic events such as concerts (admission free), competitions, master classes and conferences. Many ensembles consisting of students perform concerts on a regular basis: Karol Szymanowski Academic Symphony Orchestra, Academic Wind Orchestra, Academic Baroque Orchestra, Academic Chamber Orchestra, Mixed Choir of the Karol Szymanowski Academy of Music, Chamber Choir and Jazz Institute Big-Band. 
It organizes bigger events as well: International Festival of Academic Orchestras (every 2 years), Instrumental Music Festival (each year), Vocal Music Days (each year), International Violin Festival, Silesian Jazz Festival (each year), All-Poland Brass Instruments Competition, International Harp Festival.

Alumni 
Alumni include:
Composers: Wojciech Kilar, Henryk Mikołaj Górecki, Witold Szalonek, Eugeniusz Knapik, Aleksander Lasoń
Conductors: Karol Stryja
Piano: Tadeusz Żmudziński, Lidia Grychtołówna, Andrzej Jasiński, Jerzy Sterczyński, Krystian Zimerman, Joanna Domańska, Krzysztof Jabłoński, Przemysław Lechowski, Szczepan Kończal, Anna Górecka, Jarred Dunn
Violin: Szymon Krzeszowiec
Guitar: Marcin Dylla
Jazz and pop performers: Tomasz Szukalski, Kasia Cerekwicka, Janusz Szrom
 the Silesian String Quartet, including: Szymon Krzeszowiec

Location 
The school consists of five buildings. The oldest neo-Gothic building was constructed at the end of the 19th century (33, Wojewódzka street). It is linked with the modern building which includes a concert hall for 480 people by a spacious atrium (designed by Tomasz Konior). Apart from the concert hall, the modern building includes one of the biggest musical libraries in Poland, a music therapy hall, an electronic music laboratory, a restaurant and many other facilities. The atrium is also linked with a building in 3, Zacisze street, where the academy's authorities have their offices. The other two buildings where lectures and rehearsals take place, are located in 5, Zacisze street and 27, Krasińskiego street.

Museum of Silesian Organ 
The Museum of Silesian Organ, located in the basement of the oldest building, is the only museum of this kind in Central Europe. It gathers and preserves many objects connected with organ and its history.

International cooperation 
The academy has exchange agreements with the School of Music of University of Louisville in the United States, the Zoltán Kodály Pedagogical Institute of Music in Kecskemét in Hungary, and the department of musicology of Palacký University of Olomouc in the Czech Republic. It participates in the Socrates–Erasmus Programme.

External links

References 

Universities and colleges in Katowice
Music schools in Poland
Educational institutions established in 1929
1929 establishments in Poland